The Bleaklow Bomber was a US Air Force (USAF) Boeing RB-29A Superfortress that crashed near Higher Shelf Stones on Bleaklow in the Peak District in 1948. It was modified as a reconnaissance aircraft, rather than a bomber.

Superfortress Over Exposed 

Boeing 'RB-29A 44-61999 was part of the 16th Photographic Reconnaissance Squadron, 91st Reconnaissance Group, 311th Air Division in the Strategic Air Command of USAF. The aircraft bore the name Over Exposed after it was flown in July 1946 by the 509th Composite Group during Operation Crossroads to photograph nuclear testing at Bikini Atoll, including the dropping of an atomic bomb by B-29 Superfortress Dave's Dream. The aircraft had also taken part in the Berlin airlift during 1948.

Mission and crash incident 
The aircraft crashed at Higher Shelf Stones on the Bleaklow moorland plateau near Glossop in Derbyshire on 3 November 1948. The aircraft was on a routine daytime flight with two other aircraft, leaving RAF Scampton near Lincoln at about 10:15 and heading to the US Air Force base at Burtonwood near Warrington. The pilot Captain Landon Tanner and co-pilot Captain Harry Stroud were flying by instruments as the area was covered in low cloud. Based on the flight time, the crew believed it had passed the hills and began to descend. At about 11:00 the aircraft hit the ground at 610m above sea level, 300m north east of the summit of Higher Shelf Stones and it was engulfed in flames.
All 11 crew and 2 military passengers perished in the crash. When the aircraft failed to arrive at the Burtonwood airbase, the nearby RAF Mountain Rescue Service was called to search for the missing aircraft. Already on a training exercise upon the Kinder Scout moors, the RAF Harpur Hill rescue team headed to Bleaklow and located the crash site at about 16:30, by which time the light was fading. The debris of the aircraft was scattered with only the tail section intact. The recovery of the occupants took place the following morning and their bodies were taken to Burtonwood. The aircraft was carrying the $7,400 wages for the Burtonwood airbase. The money survived the fire and was recovered at the crash site by the American Military Police.

Crew 

 Captain Landon P. Tanner (pilot)
 Captain Harry A. Stroud (co-pilot)
 Sergeant Ralph W. Fields (engineer)
 Sergeant Charles R. Wilbanks (navigator)
 Sergeant Gene A. Gartner (radio operator)
 Sergeant David D. Moore (radar operator)
 Sergeant Saul R. Banks (camera crew)
 Sergeant Donald R. Abrogast (camera crew)
 Sergeant Robert I. Doyle (camera crew)
 Private William M. Burrows (camera crew)
 Corporal Clarence M. Franssen (passenger)
 Corporal George Ingram Jr (passenger)
 Captain Howard E. Keel (photographic advisor)

Crash site 
In 1988, a memorial was erected at the site by servicemen from RAF Finningley, with a plaque in memory of those who died in the crash.

Much of the wreckage is still exposed, including the Duplex-Cyclone engines, wing sections, fuselage sections, undercarriage and gun turrets. One of the gun turrets is on display at the air museum in Newark-on-Trent, Nottinghamshire. In the 1970s a local man found a ring at the crash site, which was identified as Captain Tanner's wedding ring and was returned to his daughter.

The area around the crash site is challenging to navigate. The most obvious route is from the trig pillar at the summit of Higher Shelf Stones. It is about a  walk to the crash site from the lay-by at the summit of Snake Pass, starting along the Pennine Way footpath through Devil's Dyke. During the COVID-19 pandemic in the United Kingdom in 2020, local Mountain Rescue teams issued warnings that inexperienced hikers should exercise caution before attempting a winter visit.

Other Bleaklow air crashes 
Several other military aircraft have crashed on the Bleaklow moors.

References 

Peak District
Aviation accidents and incidents in 1948
Aviation accidents and incidents in England